Move Your Hand is a live album by American organist Lonnie Smith recorded at Club Harlem in Atlantic City, New Jersey in 1969 and released on the Blue Note label.

Reception
The Allmusic review by Stephen Thomas Erlewine awarded the album 4 stars and stated "Move Your Hand is thoroughly enjoyable, primarily because the group never lets their momentum sag throughout the session. Though the sound of the record might be somewhat dated, the essential funk of the album remains vital".

Track listing
All compositions by Lonnie Smith except as indicated
 "Charlie Brown" (Jerry Leiber, Mike Stoller) - 8:26 
 "Layin' in the Cut" - 10:11 
 "Move Your Hand" - 9:01 
 "Sunshine Superman" (Donovan Leitch) - 10:16 
 "Dancin' in an Easy Groove" - 11:56 
Recorded at Club Harlem in Atlantic City, New Jersey on August 9, 1969

Personnel
Lonnie Smith - organ, vocals
Rudy Jones - tenor saxophone
Ronnie Cuber - baritone saxophone
Larry McGee - guitar
Sylvester Goshay - drums

References

Blue Note Records live albums
Jazz-funk albums
Lonnie Smith (organist) live albums
1969 live albums
Albums produced by Francis Wolff